Bolesław Matuszewski (August 19, 1856 Pińczów,  – c.1943 or 1944; in French texts Boleslas Matuszewski) - Polish businessman, photographer and cameraman, pioneer of cinematography and documentary film.

Biography 
He was born in 1856 in Pińczów the small Congress Poland city, which after Partitions of Poland became part of the Russian Empire. His father Aleksander was the translator of French language and his mother was Stanisława Pochowska. Bolesław Matuszewski had also two sisters and a younger brother Zygmunt.

His father taught him French language on advanced level and Matuszewski in 80. of XIX lived in Paris where he studied. In that time he was interested in photography and film. He became an employee of the Lumière company and was active photographer and cinematographer, member of photographic society "LUX".

In 1895 he came back to Poland with his younger brother Zygmunt. Both they opened a photographic atelier at Marszałkowska Street 111 in Warsaw. Soon atelier became company Lux Sigismond et Comp. Matuszewski's firm between 1897–1899 cooperated with Polish weekly magazine „Tygodnik Illustrowany”. The company was active to 1908 and produced many documentary films and photographs.

In 1897, after assuming the position of photographer to Tsar Nicholas II, he used the Lumières' Cinématographe to record the official visit to St. Petersburg, of the French President Félix Faure. After the visit, Otto von Bismarck accused Faure of not baring his head before the Russian flag on his disembarkation. However, this accusation was shown to be false based on Matuszewski's documentary.

Publications 
Matuszewski wrote two of the earliest texts on cinema. They are recognized today as the first film manifestos and the first written work to consider the historical and documentary value of film. Matuszewski is also the first filmmaker who appreciated the historical importance of film and proposed the creation of film archives for collecting and safekeeping of visual materials:

Une nouvelle source de l'histoire (eng. A New Source of History)(Paris, 1898),
La photographie animée (eng. Animated photography)(1898).
Les portraits sur emaux vitrifies (1901).

Notes

References 
 Boleslaw Matuszewski at Who's Who of Victorian Cinema, Retrieved October 26, 2006.
 Parish records prove the Who's Who of Victorian Cinema contains a mistake showing his baptism date instead of his birthdate.
 Prof. Czeczot-Gawrak's research.
 100 Years of Cinema: Remembering Boleslaw Matuszewski, Kinema, Spring 2005.
 Scott MacKenzie, Film Manifestos and Global Cinema Cultures: A Critical Anthology, Univ of California Press 2014, .
 L’archive-forme: Création, Mémoire, Histoire, Editions L’Harmattan, Paris 2014, .
 James Chapman: "Film and History. Theory and History", part "Film as historical source" p. 73-75, Palgrave Macmillan, 2013, .

Further reading 
 Tadeusz Lubelski: Historia kina polskiego. Twórcy, filmy, konteksty, VIDEOGRAF II, Katowice 2009, .

1856 births
1940s deaths
Cinema pioneers
Photographers from Warsaw
People from Pińczów County